Peđa Jerinić (born 5 December 1988) is a Serbian football midfielder.

Club career
Born in Sarajevo, SR Bosnia and Herzegovina, Jerinić played with lower league Belgrade based clubs Sinđelić, Policajac and Posavac before joining Teleoptik in 2008. In summer 2010 he moved to FK Smederevo, making his debut in the Serbian SuperLiga. In 2012, he transferred to another SuperLiga club, FK Hajduk Kula. The following half season he played with RFK Novi Sad in the Serbian First League.

References

1988 births
Living people
Footballers from Sarajevo
Serbs of Bosnia and Herzegovina
Association football midfielders
Serbian footballers
Bosnia and Herzegovina footballers
FK Sinđelić Beograd players
FK Teleoptik players
FK Smederevo players
FK Hajduk Kula players
RFK Novi Sad 1921 players
Serbian SuperLiga players
Serbian First League players